The Caproni Ca.73 was an Italian airliner produced during the 1920s which went on to serve as a light bomber in the newly independent Regia Aeronautica.

Design and development
The Ca.73 was an inverted sesquiplane with a biplane tail and two engines mounted in a push-pull configuration within a common nacelle mounted on struts in the interplane gap above the fuselage. The two pilots sat in an open cockpit, while ten passengers could be accommodated within the fuselage.

The publication of General Giulio Douhet's seminal treatise on strategic bombing Il dominio dell'aria (The Command of the Air) in 1921 had left Italy's military planners acutely aware of a lack of this capability. Established as a separate service in 1923, the Regia Aeronautica relied upon World War I-vintage Caproni Ca.3 bombers, and a replacement was soon sought. The immediate solution was to repurpose the Ca.73 as a warplane by adding a gunner's position in the nose, dorsally, and ventrally amidships. Bombs were carried on external racks on the fuselage sides.

Ca.73s remained in frontline service until 1934, and from 1926 onwards participated in Italy's military actions in North Africa.

Variants

 Ca.73 – airliner powered by Isotta Fraschini Asso 500 engines
 Ca.73bis – airliner powered by Lorraine-Dietrich engines
 Ca.73ter (later redesignated Ca.82) – bomber version with gun positions and fuselage bomb racks
 Ca.73quarter (later redesignated Ca.88) – bomber with revised control systems and strengthened airframe
 Ca.73quarterG (later redesignated Ca.89) – bomber with glazed nose, underwing bomb racks, and retractable ventral gun turret
 Ca.74 (later redesignated Ca.80) – version powered by Bristol Jupiter engines
 Ca.80 – the Ca.74 redesignated
 Ca.80S – air-ambulance and paratroop transport version
 Ca.82 – redesignated Ca.73ter
 Ca.87 – long-range record version (one converted)
 Ca.88 – redesignated Ca.73quarter 
 Ca.89 – redesignated Ca.73quarterG

Operators

Military operators

 Regia Aeronautica

Specifications (Ca.73)

See also

References

 
 

Ca.073
1920s Italian airliners
1920s Italian bomber aircraft
Biplanes with negative stagger
Aircraft first flown in 1925
Twin-engined push-pull aircraft